The Big Ten Goaltender of the Year is an annual award given out at the conclusion of the Big Ten regular season to the best goalie in the conference as voted by a media panel and the head coaches of each team.

The Goaltender of the Year was first awarded in 2014 and is a successor to the CCHA Best Goaltender which was discontinued after the conference dissolved due to the 2013–14 NCAA conference realignment.

Award winners

Winners by school

References 

Big Ten
^
Awards established in 2014